"Here's to the Zero" is a song recorded by Canadian pop-rock group Marianas Trench. It is their second single from their EP Something Old / Something New and was released on December 25, 2014 in Canada and the US. It was released outside of Canada and the US on December 29, 2014. The song peaked at number 57 on the Canadian Hot 100 chart and was certified gold in 2015.

Background and composition
"Here's to the Zeros" was originally intended to be released in their fourth album Astoria until Josh Ramsay confirmed on Twitter that the album would contain brand new songs and the track wouldn't appear on the album as it did not fit the tone. Ramsay spoke about the meaning behind the song on how it isn't possible to live a "perfect clean pop image."

Critical reception
In 2015, the song was nominated for the MMVA Fan Fave Video.

Music video
The music video premiered on March 5, 2015 and was directed by Kyle Davison and Josh Ramsay. It features the band parodying Sesame Street and spoofing the TV show Mister Rogers' Neighborhood.

Charts

Certifications

Release history

References

2014 songs
Songs written by Josh Ramsay
Marianas Trench (band) songs